The German Society for Social-Scientific Sexuality Research (German: Deutsche Gesellschaft für Sozialwissenschaftliche Sexualforschung, DGSS) is a sexuality research and counselling organization (cf. sexology) based in Düsseldorf, Germany. It is primarily devoted to sociological, behavioral, and cultural sexuality research.

History 
The DGSS was founded in 1971 by German sexologist Rolf Gindorf and colleagues. It is the oldest non-medical sexological society existing in German-language Europe (i. e., Germany, Austria, Liechtenstein, Luxembourg, and parts of Switzerland, Denmark, Belgium, France, and Italy). Its governing and international advisory boards have included many noted scholars, among them Rüdiger Lautmann, John Money, Gisela Bleibtreu-Ehrenberg, John Gagnon, Igor S. Kon НейроНет - медицинский информационый портал, Liu Dalin, and Martin S. Weinberg . Presidents were Rolf Gindorf (1971-1979, Vice Pres. -2004, now Hon. Pres.), Helmut Kentler (1979-1982), Ernest Borneman (1982-1986, now Hon. Pres.), Erwin J. Haeberle (1986-2002), Gunter Runkel (2002-2006) , and Jakob Pastoetter (2006-).

From the very beginning, the DGSS has emphasized the importance of the social, behavioral, and cultural sciences for an adequate understanding of the human sexualities in their many forms, facets, and variations. In addition to traditional sexological fields like biology, physiology, and medicine, the DGSS focus has centered on the social sciences, psychology, and ethnology, embracing also educational, legal, and historical aspects. In 1978, the DGSS added a pioneering counselling institute ("DGSS-Institut") to its scientific and research activities. Since then, more than 33,000 clients received sexual counselling or psychotherapy. Gay, lesbian and bisexual people form a considerable group. AIDS counseling and HIV antibody testing has been provided since 1983.
 
Under difficult circumstances, with habitually low financial resources and extremely modest outside support, the DGSS has nevertheless managed to hold increasingly successful national and international sexological congresses, establishing a close cooperation with most German and many foreign sexological societies. An impressive number of scientific publications, including many books and a book series ("Schriftenreihe Sozialwissenschaftliche Sexualforschung", Berlin/New York: W. de Gruyter, since 1986; Münster/Hamburg/London: LIT Verlag, since 2003) give a fairly adequate impression of sexological research by the DGSS and its members. 

Once the Berlin wall had fallen, the DGSS was able to move its congresses to the original birthplace of sexology, and to resume the tradition of the Berlin sexological conferences started in 1921 by Magnus Hirschfeld. From July 25–27, 1997, the XIII. DGSS Congress of Social Scientific Sex Research, being at the same time the VI. International Berlin Conference for Sexology), took place at Berlin's old Humboldt University. Its theme: "100 Years of Gay Liberation". Scientists (most of them gay) came from many countries in Europe, the Americas, Asia and Australia. 

From June 29 through July 2, 2000, the XIV. DGSS Congress was held in conjunction with the V. Conference of the European Federation of Sexology (EFS) in Berlin's "House of World Cultures", hosting some 270 delegates from 34 countries. Its theme: "For A Millennium of Sexual Health". In 2002, the XVth DGSS Conference from June 21–23 was moved, following the DGSS  president-elect Gunter Runkel, to the romantic, historic town of Lüneburg (near Hamburg) and its modern university. Its general theme: "Sexualities in the Third Millennium - Recent Developments in Sexuality Research". Again, sexologists from many nations attended, colleagues from the United States forming the largest contingent. In 2004, the XVI. DGSS Conference on "Sexualities and Social Change" was likewise held in Lüneburg, where the XVII. Conference ("Sexuality and Love") also took place on Sept. 22-24, 2006. The XVIIIth DGSS Conference ("Sexuality and the Media") will take place in Munich from Nov. 7-9, 2008, again with many Americans scheduled to attend.

Magnus Hirschfeld Medal recipients 

Since 1990, the DGSS has been awarding its Magnus Hirschfeld Medals for Sexual Science and for Sexual Reform. Recipients so far were Ernest Borneman (Austria), John P. DeCecco (U.S.A.), Liu Dalin (China), Jonathan Ned Katz (U.S.A), Milton Diamond (U.S.A), John Money (U.S.A), Martin S. Weinberg (U.S.A.), Richard Green (U.S.A/UK) and Hu Peicheng (China) for Sexual Science (Sexology); Herman Musaph (The Netherlands), Imre Aszódi (Hungary), Ruth Westheimer ("Dr. Ruth"; U.S.A.), Maj-Briht Bergström-Walan (Sweden), Oswalt Kolle (The Netherlands), Manfred Bruns (Germany), William Granzig (U.S.A), Rolf Gindorf, Rita Süssmuth (Germany) and Robert T. Francoeur (U.S.A.) for Sexual Reform.

References

External links
 DGSS Web Site

Sexology organizations
Sexual orientation and medicine
Organizations established in 1971
Medical and health organisations based in North Rhine-Westphalia
1971 establishments in Germany